Quercus purulhana is a species of oak native to Mexico and Central America. It is found in Belize, Guatemala, Honduras, Nicaragua, and the Chiapas state of southern Mexico. It is a montane forest species. It is an IUCN Red List near-threatened species, threatened by habitat loss. It is placed in section Quercus.

References

purhulana
Flora of Belize
Flora of Guatemala
Flora of Honduras
Trees of Chiapas
Flora of Nicaragua
Trees of Central America
Taxonomy articles created by Polbot
Taxa named by William Trelease